The New National Party (NNP), also known as NNP Grenada, Carriacou and Petite Martinique, is a conservative political party in Grenada. It is led by former Prime Minister, Keith Mitchell.

The party was founded in August 1984 through the merger of the Grenada National Party, led by Herbert Blaize, the National Democratic Party, led by George Brizan, and the Grenada Democratic Movement (GDM), led by Francis Alexis. Led by Blaize, the NNP won 14 out of 15 seats in the December 1984 general election, and Blaize became Prime Minister. Mitchell was elected as leader of the NNP in January 1989, defeating Prime Minister Herbert Blaize. In the 1990 general election, the NNP won two seats and was left in opposition.

The party was victorious in the 1995 general election, winning eight out of 15 seats in the House of Representatives, and Mitchell became Prime Minister. After the NNP lost its majority due to the resignation of Raphael Fletcher, the Minister of Foreign Affairs, in November 1998, an  early election was called for January 1999, the New National Party (NNP) won all seats. The NNP narrowly won a third term in power in the November 2003 election, reduced to a one-seat parliamentary majority.

In the general election held on 27 November 2003, the party won 48.0% of the popular vote and 8 out of 15 seats. In the July 2008 general election, the party lost to the National Democratic Congress (NDC), winning four seats against 11 for the NDC. NDC leader Tillman Thomas succeeded Mitchell as Prime Minister of Grenada.

In the 2013 general election, the New National Party returned to power, after winning all 15 seats. This was the second time a political party won all constituencies in a general election. At the 2018 General Election, the New National Party was able to retain all 15 seats.  In November 2021, Prime Minister Keith Mitchell said that the upcoming general elections which are constitutionally due no later than June 2023, will be the last one for him. Early elections were held in June 2022 and Mitchell ultimately led the party to defeat.

List of leaders of the New National Party

Electoral history

House of Representatives elections

See also 
 Brenda Hood, parliamentarian and Cabinet Minister

References

External links
 

Political parties in Grenada
Conservative parties in Grenada
International Democrat Union member parties
Political parties established in 1984
1984 establishments in Grenada
Main